The Ford Crown Victoria ("Crown Vic") is a full-size sedan that was marketed and manufactured by Ford. The successor to the Ford LTD Crown Victoria, two generations of the model line were produced from the 1992 until the 2012 model years. The Ford counterpart of the Mercury Grand Marquis, the Crown Victoria was the largest sedan marketed by Ford in North America, slotted above the Ford Taurus. The Crown Victoria Police Interceptor (1992–2011) was marketed specifically for law-enforcement use; a long-wheelbase Crown Victoria sedan (2002–2011) was marketed primarily for taxi cab fleets.

The Crown Victoria was produced on the rear-wheel drive, body-on-frame Ford Panther platform, sharing its chassis with the Grand Marquis and Lincoln Town Car. From 1997 until their 2011 discontinuation, the three model lines were the sole four-door sedans produced in North America with a full-length frame, rear-wheel drive, and a standard V8 engine. While the front and rear crumple zones were engineered into the vehicle, it was one of Ford's products that were not of unibody construction for the entire generation.

For its entire production, the Crown Victoria was produced by Ford Canada alongside the Grand Marquis at St. Thomas Assembly in Southwold, Ontario. From 1991 until 2011, over 1.5 million cars (including Police Interceptors) were produced by St. Thomas Assembly prior to its closure. A 2012 Crown Victoria (intended for Middle East export) was the final vehicle produced by the facility. Following the discontinuation of the model line, the Crown Victoria was not directly replaced, with the full-size Ford Taurus serving as the next basis for Ford police cars.

Origin of name 
Prior to the 1992 model year, Ford used the Crown Victoria nameplate on two vehicles; both were flagship models of their full-size model range. From 1955 until 1956, the nameplate was used for premium two-door Ford Fairlanes. For 1980, the nameplate returned as the top trim of Ford LTD sedans, denoting all Ford full-size sedans in North America from 1983 through 1991.

A styling feature used for both versions is a stainless-steel band trimming the B-pillars ("crowning" the roof).

1955–1956

For 1955, the Ford Fairlane was introduced as the premium Ford model range. Slotted above the Victoria two-door hardtop, the Crown Victoria debuted as the flagship trim of the Fairlane. In place of the popular hardtop roofline, the Crown Victoria was fitted with a B-pillared roofline. Similar to the Mercury XM-800 concept car (though changed in angle), the B-pillar was fitted with a wide stainless-steel band ("crowning" the roof), giving a sleeker appearance to the roofline.

Alongside the standard two-tone roof, the Crown Victoria Skyliner was fitted with a fixed sunroof; a tinted acrylic glass panel formed the entire roof ahead of the B-pillar.

For 1956, the Lifeguard option package was introduced as an option for the Fairlane Crown Victoria (as with all Ford cars).

For the 1957 redesign of the Ford model line, the Crown Victoria was retired from the Fairlane series with no replacement. The Skyliner name made its return in a different form, denoting the Ford Fairlane 500 Skyliner retractable hardtop convertible.

1980–1991

For the 1980 model year, the Crown Victoria nameplate was revived after a 23-year hiatus, becoming part of the Ford LTD model range. Again, a premium trim of the full-size range (replacing the LTD Landau), the LTD Crown Victoria became two-door and four-door sedans. To distinguish the model line from its Mercury (Grand) Marquis counterpart, Ford revived the stainless-steel band to trim the B-pillars (in heavily revised form); the design was used on examples with the standard vinyl half roof.

For 1983, as part of an extensive revision of the midsize and full-size model lines of all three Ford divisions, the LTD Crown Victoria became a stand-alone model line (alongside its Mercury Grand Marquis counterpart); the Ford LTD nameplate was shifted to the midsize segment, replacing the Ford Granada. While having a separate roofline (separate doors and B-pillar trim) from its sedan counterparts, the LTD Country Squire station wagon shared its interior trim with the Crown Victoria sedan (a non-woodgrain Crown Victoria wagon was also introduced).

Discontinued after the 1991 model year, the LTD Crown Victoria (and LTD Country Squire station wagon) marked the final usage of the Ford LTD nameplate in North America. Ford of Australia produced its own Ford LTD as its flagship model line (derived from its own Fairlane) from 1973 until 2007; as neither Mercury nor Lincoln have ever officially been marketed in Australia, the LTD was developed as a luxury vehicle.

First generation (EN53; 1992–1997)

In the first quarter of 1987, development began on a redesign codenamed "EN53". The Ford Crown Victoria was unveiled on November 28, 1990, and began production in January 1991 as a 1992 model, launching on March 21, 1991. Fleet sales of the vehicle were postponed for 14 months to maximize availability for buyers at launch. In line with the redesign of the 1991 Chevrolet Caprice (its chief competitor), the 1992 Crown Victoria featured a major exterior redesign, while retaining the previous-generation chassis. Ford reduced the coefficient of drag of the exterior from 0.42 to 0.34 (nearly matching the 0.32 of the Ford Taurus) to enhance aerodynamics and fuel efficiency, giving the first generation Crown Victoria its sleek, wedge-shaped design that came to be known as the "aero" look.

Due to a market shift in family-oriented vehicles, the Crown Victoria was offered exclusively as a four-door sedan, with the wood-trimmed LTD Country Squire station wagon discontinued. While the Ford Taurus and Mercury Sable continued in production with optional three-row seating, the Country Squire was essentially replaced by the Ford Aerostar, Ford Econoline/Club Wagon, and Ford Explorer.

Ford benefitted from a unique loophole in CAFE standards when the 1992 Crown Victoria and its Grand Marquis twin were launched. To avoid paying gas-guzzler taxes, Ford modified its supplier network so that the two vehicles could be classified as imports from Canada, effectively removing the full-size sedans from the Ford domestic CAFE fleet (alongside the Ford Mustang V8) and placing them in its imported fleet (alongside the Ford Festiva).

Chassis 
In lieu of developing an all-new platform architecture from the ground up, the Crown Victoria retained the Panther platform of its LTD Crown Victoria predecessor. Although launched in 1978, the Panther chassis underwent extensive upgrades to improve its road manners and handling; major updates were made to the steering and suspension tuning. To improve braking performance, the Crown Victoria gained four-wheel disc brakes, which were only seen on the Lincoln Mark VII, Ford Taurus SHO, and Ford Escort GT (1991-1996). Available as options, anti-lock brakes and low-speed traction control became popular features. For 1997, several updates were made to improve handling response and steering control

Showcased in the redesign was the new Modular V8 engine. First introduced in the 1991 Lincoln Town Car, the 4.6 L SOHC V8 replaced the overhead-valve  small block V8 and was the first of a family of overhead-cam engines that would eventually appear in several Ford and Lincoln-Mercury cars and trucks. Lighter than its predecessor, the 4.6 produced nearly identical torque output while producing 40 additional horsepower in its standard single-exhaust configuration. As with its predecessor and the Lincoln Town Car, the 4.6 was paired with a four-speed overdrive automatic transmission. In 1993, the Ford AOD transmission was replaced by the electronically controlled AOD-E version. For 1995, the AOD-E was replaced by the 4R70W, a heavier-duty version introduced in the Lincoln Mark VIII.

Body 

Ford based much of the Crown Victoria's appearance on the first-generation Ford Taurus, a look pioneered by Ford VP of Design Jack Telnack. Though the Taurus became wildly popular in its market segment, Telnack's "aero" look proved to be either a love or hate proposition with potential buyers of the Crown Victoria. Along with its distinctive no-grille front fascia, the Crown Victoria shared a similar roofline with the Taurus, similar body and bumper moldings, similar door handles, aircraft-style doors, and similarly shaped headlamp and taillamp clusters. To reduce aesthetic commonality with the Mercury Grand Marquis, only the front doors, windshield, and alloy wheels were shared between them.

For the interior, the two vehicles also were given different seats, door trim, and dashboards; the Crown Victoria featured an instrument panel with round dials that included voltage and oil-pressure gauges, while the Grand Marquis featured a horizontal speedometer without the full instrumentation. An electronic instrument panel was introduced as an option, featuring a trip computer with two trip odometers, instantaneous and average fuel economy, distance remaining to empty fuel tank, and outside temperature readout. Though better received than the 1991 redesign of the Chevrolet Caprice, the 1992 Crown Victoria was met with disapproval from some critics and buyers, leading Ford to revise the exterior. For the model year 1993, a grille was added to the front fascia (though it retained its "bottom-breather" cooling system configuration) and a red reflector strip was added to the trunk lid to visually connect the taillamps. For the 1995 model year, a midcycle redesign had more extensive changes to the Crown Victoria; a 6-six-slot grille replaced the egg-crate design, and wider taillamps were added to the rear with the license plate positioned between them on the trunk lid. Inside, the 1995 Crown Victoria had redesigned seats and a new dashboard, which was now shared with the Grand Marquis. The new design featured larger controls and switches, with the radio enlarged and positioned higher. The gauge cluster retained its previous layout. In late 1995, the first-generation "brick" airbag steering wheel was replaced by one with a smaller hub that returned the horn button to the center of the wheel.

Features 

As with its LTD Crown Victoria predecessor, the Crown Victoria was a six-passenger automobile; the front seat was a 50/50 split bench seat. The Crown Victoria was sold in two trim levels: base and LX, with the latter forming the majority of nonfleet sales. In addition, the Crown Victoria P71 replaced the fleet-market "S" designation in 1993; the P71 was marketed exclusively for law-enforcement sales.

As with the Mercury Grand Marquis, a driver airbag was standard equipment and a passenger airbag was added as an option during later 1991 production. It later became standard in 1993 for the 1994 model year. Popular features were the antilock brakes and low-speed traction control. For 1996, a single-key entry system became standard, along with a hidden radio antenna, rear window defroster, and tinted glass. Automatic digital climate control and a JBL audio system became available on the LX.

For 1993, cupholders were added to the pull-out dashboard ashtray drawer, and the date feature was removed from the digital clock. A one-touch down feature was added for the driver's door power window as standard equipment, while a remote keyless entry system with trunk release and panic alarm as well as an auto-dimming electrochromic rearview mirror became optional equipment. Audio systems were also updated with an optional JBL sound system with a subwoofer and an optional 10-disc CD changer.

Touring Sedan 
For 1992, Ford introduced the Crown Victoria Touring Sedan as a performance-oriented flagship trim. The Touring Sedan featured a number of suspension and handling improvements over the Crown Victoria LX, featuring the heavier-duty suspension components of the police-package version, and also including wider tires, rear air suspension, removal of the speed limiter, and a 210 hp dual-exhaust variant of the 4.6 L V8. Optional features included speed-sensitive steering and larger-diameter sway bars. Distinguished by its standard two-tone exterior paint scheme (with painted alloy wheels), the Touring Sedan featured a unique leather interior with every feature available on a Crown Victoria at the time. For a lower price, Ford offered the performance upgrades of the Touring Sedan on the LX as the Handling and Performance Package alongside a separate towing package. The Touring Sedan was a one-year-only model, as it was discontinued after 1992. However, the Handling and Performance Package remained an option in various forms until 2007.

Production figures

Second generation (EN114; 1998–2012)

The second generation Crown Victoria commenced sales on December 26, 1997. Although the 1992-1997 Ford Crown Victoria had better critical and marketplace acceptance than the controversial styling of the 1991 Chevrolet Caprice, its sales struggled to match those of its Mercury Grand Marquis counterpart. In an effort to gain acceptance among buyers (and increase parts commonality), for the 1998 model year, the Crown Victoria adopted much of the exterior design of the Mercury Grand Marquis.

Following its 1998 introduction, the second-generation Crown Victoria underwent an extensive revision for the 2003 model year. Introduced in April 2002, while the exterior saw no change, nearly the entire chassis was redesigned, with major updates to the suspension and steering.

Chassis 
The second-generation Ford Crown Victoria continued the use of the Ford Panther platform, shared with the Mercury Grand Marquis and Lincoln Town Car.

Under the 1998 redesign, several changes were made to the rear suspension to improve general road manners (at the expense of reduced towing capacity). The original three-link coil-spring configuration was replaced with a four-link configuration with a Watt's linkage. Continuing the use of four-wheel disc brakes, for 1998, enlarged brake rotors necessitated a shift to 16-inch wheels for all Crown Victoria models. For 1999, ABS became standard on all Crown Victorias (except Police Interceptors).

For the 2003 model year, the suspension and steering underwent an extensive update, paired with the chassis redesign. For the first time, the Crown Victoria adopted rack and pinion steering (replacing the long-running recirculating ball system), with the adoption of aluminum front control arms. In the rear, twin-tube shocks (in use since the mid-1960s), were replaced by monotube shocks; to improve maintenance and on-road handling, the shocks were moved to the outside of the chassis rails. As part of the suspension upgrades, the Panther-chassis vehicles were fitted with wheels with a high positive offset (flat-face). For 2006, the steel wheels of the Crown Victoria shifted to a 17-inch diameter.

The second-generation is powered by a single engine, the 4.6 L SOHC 16-valve Modular V8. While carried over from the previous generation, output for 1998 was raised to 200 hp (dual-exhaust examples produced 215 hp). For 1998, the distributorless ignition system (with two coil packs) was replaced by coil-on-plug ignition (a feature first used on the DOHC 4.6 L V8, and shared with other iterations of the Modular V8 for 1998). For 2001, the engine received new cylinder heads (from the Mustang GT), raising output to 220 hp (235 hp in dual-exhaust configuration). For 2003, the engine output was increased further, to 224 hp and 239 hp (depending on exhaust configuration); the increase resulted from a knock sensor fitted to the engine. For 2004, engine output was increased for the last time, as the Police Interceptor raised output to 250 hp (as its engine received the air intake of the Mercury Marauder). For 2005, the engine underwent a minor revision, as it adopted electronic "drive-by-wire" throttle control.

From 1998 through 2004, the 4R70W four-speed automatic was paired with the 4.6 L V8, replaced by the 4R70E after 2005 (the latter designed to accommodate electronic throttle controls); the 4R75W was exclusive to the 2004 Police Interceptor.

Body 
Following the poor critical and sales acceptance of the 1991-1996 Chevrolet Caprice and Buick Roadmaster, for the second-generation Crown Victoria, Ford sought a more conservative exterior design, choosing design commonality with the Mercury Grand Marquis over the Ford Taurus. The Crown Victoria adopted the formal notchback roofline of its Mercury counterpart, sharing all four doors (previously, the front doors were shared). On the front fascia, both the grille and headlamps were enlarged. The rear fascia underwent a redesign, as large taillamp units were mounted at the corners of the body, replacing the previous full-width design. In contrast to its Mercury counterpart, the Crown Victoria was nearly devoid of chrome trim, largely restricted to the grille, window trim, and trunk lid.

In contrast to the exterior, relatively few changes were made to the interior, updated for the 1995 model year. Offering nearly the same features as the Grand Marquis, the Crown Victoria was largely differentiated by its (optional) wood trim and seating materials. The steering wheel was changed in 1996 to one similar to the rest of Ford's lineup at the time.

To comply with US federal regulations, for 2000, the Crown Victoria adopted an emergency trunk release system, alongside other safety features, including LATCH anchors and "Belt Minder" (seat belt reminder chime that sounds for an unbelted front seat occupant). For 2001, the dual airbags were redesigned, replaced by dual-stage airbags; power-adjustable pedals became an option. For 2003, seat-mounted side airbags became an option. For the 2007 model year, the optional side airbags underwent revision to better protect passengers in side-impact collisions.

For the 2002 model year, heated exterior side mirrors became available, along with standard floor mats and improved cloth upholstery; for LX-trim vehicles, a trunk storage organizer became an option.

In contrast to the extensive mechanical changes for the 2003 model year (and redesigns of the Mercury Grand Marquis and Lincoln Town Car), the Ford Crown Victoria saw no exterior changes since the 1998 model year, excluding wheels (grille, bumper trim, and rear fascia trim changes were limited to Police Interceptors). For the interior, a minor update gave redesigned front and rear seats (distinguished by taller head restraints) and redesigned door panels. The popular blue interior shade was discontinued in 2003.

During the 2003 model year (after December 2002 production), Ford began to reduce the content included on the Crown Victoria, removing the amber-color turn-signal lenses, body-color side-view mirrors, front-seat map pouches, locking fuel cap, automatic-release parking brake, and engine compartment light. For 2004, in one of the first American cars to do so, the Crown Victoria adopted laminated door glass as an option; along with providing additional security, the feature filtered UV light and heat from the interior. The overhead console was redesigned.

For 2005, the Crown Victoria received a new nonlocking steering column, which gave the model its first new steering wheel since 1998. For the first time, the Crown Victoria offered a moonroof as an option; in line with other Ford vehicles, a six-disc CD changer became an option. The AM/FM antenna was mounted on the rear quarter panel for one year, also.

For 2006, the dashboard of the Crown Victoria saw a revision, as Ford introduced a new instrument panel (for the first time since 1992). Along with becoming the final Ford Motor Company vehicle fitted with a tachometer in North America, the 2006 Crown Victoria became the final Ford vehicle to adopt a digital odometer (as the digital instrument panel option was discontinued); Police Interceptors were given an engine hour meter.

Trim 
Carried over from the 1992-1997 Crown Victoria, the second-generation Crown Victoria was marketed in two trim levels: Ford Crown Victoria and Ford Crown Victoria LX (internally designated P73 and P74, respectively). The Crown Victoria P71 was carried over, with Ford creating the Crown Victoria Police Interceptor as a stand-alone model for 1999.

For 2000, Ford offered a "Special Edition" option package for the LX; along with namesake exterior badging, the interior was fitted with two-tone leather seating.

For 2001, Ford offered a counterpart to the Mercury Grand Marquis LSE, named the Sport Appearance Package. Alongside the standard Handling and Performance Package, the Sport Appearance Package offered five-passenger seating with a floor-mounted shifter, five-spoke aluminum wheels, and monochromatic exterior trim. For 2002, the Sport Appearance Package was renamed Crown Victoria LX Sport; with the Handling and Performance Package, it was fitted with rear air suspension, a 3.27:1 rear-axle ratio, and a larger rear stabilizer bar. Sharing many of the performance upgrades of the Mercury Marauder (except for the engine), the LX Sport was produced through 2006. For 2007, most features of the LX Sport returned as the Handling and Performance Package became a stand-alone option. The LX Handling and Performance package was finally discontinued midway through the 2008 model year.

Base - Included: Cloth upholstery, manual seats, power locks, power windows with automatic driver's side window, solar glass, power remote control mirrors, illuminated entry, steel rims with hubcaps, air conditioning, battery saver that turns off lights after 30 minutes, power trunk release, power steering, and an AM/FM stereo with clock (later, a cassette player was added, then a single-CD player replaced the cassette deck). Later standard features were a power driver's seat and wiper-activated automatic headlamps.
LX - Added: Luxury cloth upholstery, power driver's seat (later, power front seats), keyless entry, cross-spoke hubcaps, an AM/FM stereo with a cassette player (later, a single CD/cassette player, then just a single-CD player) and clock, and illuminated mirrors.
LX Sport - Added: auto-dimming rearview mirror, heated exterior mirrors, monochromatic exterior trim (on select colors), 17-inch “Sport” wheels, upgraded sport-tuned suspension components, rear air suspension, standard dual exhaust, standard leather interior trim, a floor-mounted shifter with center console, front bucket seats, an AM/FM stereo with single CD and cassette players, and steering wheel audio and climate controls.

2008–2011: Fleet sales

In 2006, after factoring out fleet/Police Interceptor sales (95% of production), retail sales of the Crown Victoria dwindled to 3,000 (coming within 1,100 units of the Ford GT supercar), outsold by its Mercury Grand Marquis counterpart by an 18-to-1 margin. For 2008, Ford ended retail sales of the Crown Victoria in the United States, removing the model from its website (later replacing it with the newly revived 2008 Ford Taurus). Ford Fleet sales continued of the Police Interceptor and commercial (taxi/fleet/LWB) variants. Subsequently, the only retail market selling the Ford Crown Victoria was the GCC/Middle East, with the Crown Victoria sold alongside the Mercury Grand Marquis.

For 2009, the Crown Victoria model line underwent a consolidation, as the LX became the sole version of the standard-wheelbase Crown Victoria (alongside the Police Interceptor). In line with its Mercury and Lincoln counterparts, 17-inch wheels became standard, with the LX adopting the five-spoke alloy wheels of the LX Sport/Handling and Performance Package (the package itself was discontinued during the 2008 model year). To streamline manufacturing, several features were standardized, including power-adjustable pedals and side airbags. To comply with federal regulations, recessed power-window switches were added (replacing a design used since 1995).

The Ford Crown Victoria is the only Panther vehicle that was produced for the 2012 model year, as the Mercury Grand Marquis, Lincoln Town Car, and Ford Crown Victoria Police Interceptor were discontinued during the 2011 model year. As 2012 production was illegal for sale in the United States (due to lack of stability control), the entire 2012 production was exported to the Middle East.

Discontinuation
From the 1992 introduction of the Crown Victoria to the 2005 introduction of the Ford Five Hundred, the layout of American full-size sedans underwent an extensive transition. By 1996, as General Motors ended production of the Chevrolet Caprice, Buick Roadmaster, and Cadillac Fleetwood, virtually all competitors of the Crown Victoria had adopted front-wheel drive, with a five-passenger configuration largely replacing six-passenger seating (with the first two generations of the Toyota Avalon becoming the sole Japanese-brand sedan marketed in North America with a front bench seat).

As an unintended consequence of the 1996 discontinuation of the Chevrolet Caprice, in the late 1990s, the Crown Victoria secured a near-monopoly of police car sales and a significant market share of taxi vehicles; both segments viewed body-on-frame construction with rear-wheel drive as advantageous attributes. The remaining competitor of Crown Victoria was its Mercury Grand Marquis counterpart. To decrease internal competition, marketing for the Crown Victoria was reduced, shifting buyers interested in Ford vehicles to the Taurus; buyers seeking full-size vehicles were shifted towards the Mercury Grand Marquis and Lincoln Town Car.

For 2005, Ford introduced the Five Hundred sedan, deriving its chassis components from the Volvo S80. The larger of the two cars intended to replace the Ford Taurus (alongside the Ford Fusion), the front-wheel drive Five Hundred was the first completely new full-size Ford sedan since 1979. While nearly a foot shorter than the Crown Victoria, the Five Hundred offered comparable interior dimensions; in a major shift, the Five Hundred adopted a five-passenger configuration as standard.

The 2006 Ford restructuring plan. The Way Forward, ultimately sealed the fate of the Ford Crown Victoria. Coinciding with the 2008 withdrawal of the Crown Victoria from retail sales (see above), in 2009, Ford announced the 2011 closure of St. Thomas Assembly in Southwold, Ontario, Canada. At the time, the production of the Ford Panther platform was to cease, as the architecture was unable to support the electronic stability control, required for 2012 vehicles sold in the United States and Canada. Along with this announcement, the Mercury Grand Marquis and Lincoln Town Car were discontinued without replacement (the former, as part of the closure of the Mercury brand).

From August 31, 2011, St. Thomas Assembly produced a short run of 2012 model year Ford Crown Victorias; all vehicles were produced for GCC export, as they were illegal for sale in the United States and Canada. On September 15, 2011, the final Ford Crown Victoria rolled off the assembly line, destined for export to Saudi Arabia; the vehicle was the final Panther-platform vehicle produced and the final vehicle produced at St. Thomas Assembly.

As with the Mercury Grand Marquis and Lincoln Town Car, the Ford Crown Victoria was discontinued with no direct successor. The Crown Victoria Police Interceptor is the only Panther-platform vehicle that was directly replaced, as Ford introduced Ford Police Interceptor sedan (based on the Taurus) and the Police Interceptor Utility (based on the Ford Explorer); both vehicles are derived from each other and are redesigned versions of the chassis introduced by the Ford Five Hundred. In 2010, a variant of the Ford Transit Connect was developed specifically for taxicab usage. While not the winner of the New York City Taxi of Tomorrow competition, the Transit Connect has been adopted for use elsewhere in the United States.

Variants

Police Interceptor (1998–2011)

Starting with the 1998 model year, the police version of the Crown Victoria, previously named own Victoria P71, was changed to Police Interceptor, and new rear badging was assigned instead of the standard Crown Victoria badge. Though the Crown Victoria badge is still affixed to Police Interceptors equipped with the Street Appearance package for vehicles that require ordinary styling (undercover cars, office/city motor pool, fire departments, etc.). 

Police Interceptor models come with a black front grille, a black rear fascia on the trunk lid, with chrome trim under the taillights through 1999 models and black trim under the taillights on 2000 and later models; 1999 through 2000 models have a blacked-out version of the standard chrome bar grille, while 2001 and up models have a black honeycomb type grille. They also have several "heavier-duty" mechanical upgrades, and newer models have additional safety features to deal with fuel-tank safety concerns. Ford has replaced the Crown Victoria Police Interceptor with upgraded and heavy-duty versions of the Ford Explorer and Ford Taurus. 

In response, many police departments like that of Austin, Texas, are buying reserve supplies of the last Crown Victorias to allow them to maintain a fleet of reliable police cars into the future.

Long-wheelbase commercial version (2002–2012)
 
In 2002, Ford introduced a long-wheelbase version of the Crown Victoria featuring a six-inch extension to a 120.7-inch wheelbase. As with the extended-wheelbase Lincoln Town Car L, the long-wheelbase Crown Victoria was modified through the use of a longer frame and longer rear doors; all additional interior room was added to the rear seat.

While not offered for retail sale in North America, the long-wheelbase Crown Victoria was offered for fleet sale, targeted directly for sales in taxi and livery markets. From 2002 until 2006, a special-service version was offered for law-enforcement sale (though not as a Police Interceptor) with street-appearance trim from 2002 through 2004. For GCC export (see below), Ford offered long-wheelbase versions of both the Crown Victoria and Mercury Grand Marquis for retail sale.

Export

Canada 
Ford of Canada (the official manufacturer of the Crown Victoria, Police Interceptor, and Mercury Grand Marquis) marketed the Ford Crown Victoria in Canada through the 1999 model year. For the 2000 model year, the Crown Victoria was replaced in retail markets by the Mercury Grand Marquis (sold at Ford dealerships); the Crown Victoria was restricted to fleet sales (consisting largely of the Police Interceptor).

After the 2011 model year, Ford of Canada ended sales of the Grand Marquis, Crown Victoria, and Crown Victoria Police Interceptor; their lack of stability control precluded further legal sale in Canada. All three model lines were replaced by the sixth-generation Ford Taurus.

Middle East (GCC) 
Through its production, the Ford Crown Victoria was exported to the Gulf Cooperation Council nations alongside its Lincoln-Mercury counterparts. In a region favoring full-size sedans (among other vehicles), the Crown Victoria became popular, as buyers of the region favored its durability, reliability, and ease of use (in comparison to German and British luxury vehicles), along with its lower price. As American nameplates shifted to newer vehicles (with the introduction of the Chrysler 300C, Dodge Charger, and the Chevrolet Caprice becoming a variant of the Holden Caprice), during the 2000s, the Crown Victoria, Grand Marquis, and Lincoln Town Car, while still popular, began to lose market share, primarily due to their age.

Panther-chassis sedans destined for Middle East export were referred to as "GCC-Spec" vehicles. Five versions of the Crown Victoria were available: Standard, Sport, Long-wheelbase, LX, and LX Sport. Unlike the United States and Canada, the long-wheelbase Crown Victoria was available for retail sale. In Kuwait, where the Crown Victoria was outsold by the higher-trim Mercury Grand Marquis, only the Standard and Long-wheelbase versions were sold after 2000 (the LX was discontinued in 1999).

Modifications from American vehicles
Along with a metric instrument panel, several modifications are made to GCC-Spec Crown Victorias. In place of the 50/50 bench seat of the standard Crown Victoria, GCC-Spec vehicles use a 40/20/40 bench seat. Derived from the Lincoln Town Car, the front seat has air conditioning vents for the rear seats (except for LX Sport models), an eight-way driver's seat, a four-way manual passenger seat (an eight-way power seat as an option); seat upholstery is either cloth or leather. On all standard-wheelbase models, a true dual-exhaust system was fitted (not available on an American Crown Victoria). On Standard and Standard Long-Wheelbase models, a driver's side spotlight assembly was optional. A DVD entertainment system (marketed as Export DVD Entertainment System) was added for the 2007 model year; it was optional on Sport, LX, and LX Sport models.

Differing from its American/Canadian counterpart, the warranty offered for a GCC-spec Crown Victoria was 5 years/200,000 kilometers (125,000 miles) – whichever came first.

Derived from the Mercury Marauder, a trunk-lid spoiler was either standard or an option on all standard-wheelbase models. For GCC-spec vehicles, the optional Handling and Performance Package (HPP) offered in the United States was rebranded the Export Handling Package (EHP). The EHP differed from the HPP largely by its retention of the 2.73:1 rear axle ratio (the standard-equipment "taller" axle) and the use of a true dual exhaust system (standard equipment on all standard-wheelbase export Crown Victorias). Included as part of the Sport and LX Sport trims (optional on the LX), the package includes tuned rear air suspension, revised coil springs, handling shock absorbers, and a larger rear stabilizer bar. On GCC-Spec Crown Victorias, the EHP option is externally distinguished by a monochromatic paint scheme, with Ford offering Dark Toreador Red, Silver Birch, Tungsten, and Black as color choices.

2008 Special Edition 
With no major redesign of the Crown Victoria since 1998, to keep the model line competitive, the GCC importer of Ford vehicles designed a commemorative trim package for the Ford Crown Victoria for the 2008 model year. Exclusive to GCC-Spec Standard models, the cosmetic package added several cosmetic features, including:

Everything else on the Special Edition package is identical to the Standard-trim model. Not listed in any sales literature, in Saudi Arabia, it was available in a choice of different colors. In Kuwait, the Special Edition was only available in black (due to market size); the price was about KWD 6,000 (roughly US$22,000). For 2009, the Special Edition was withdrawn.

Safety concerns

Fuel tank

The reports that the cars were more prone to fires during a rear collision were a simple combination of three things. First, most law-enforcement agencies relied heavily on the Crown Victoria as their primary vehicle, meaning that any police-related auto accident was very likely to involve a Crown Victoria. Second, the accidents occurred as the result of the officers intentionally parking their vehicles close to active traffic to shield a stopped motorist—something most regular drivers would never do. Third, the impacting vehicle was often traveling at, or above, the posted legal limit ( in most jurisdictions).

The condition was exacerbated by police equipment installers drilling over the package tray in the luggage compartment. Due to the gas tank's orientation, drilling through the package tray may result in drilling into the gas tank. Installers also used screws set directly into the bulkhead and facing the fuel tank. In the event of a high-energy collision, these screws could be forced into the tank, both rupturing the tank and possibly acting as a spark source. Long bolts for mounting heavier equipment were also directly suspect. The manufacturer provided an aftermarket shield to help prevent these items from puncturing the tank during impact. Further, many investigations, both performed by federal/state agencies, and the police department themselves, have found that removable items in the trunk were improperly stowed. These items became tank-piercing projectiles during the rear-collision scenarios. Ford's second solution came in the form of a recall kit including patterns to mark unsafe areas (to drill) in the luggage compartment. Also included were rubberized Kevlar(R) and hard ballistic nylon shields for the differential cover lower shock bolts. They also included a Kevlar-based trunk liner. Ford used similar kits on early-1980s model passenger vehicles. For 2005 and newer models, Ford offers an optional onboard fire-suppression system for the Crown Victoria Police Interceptor units. The system itself is integrated with the antilock braking system as part of the activation and can be activated manually. However, Ford does cite several system limitations regarding fuel loss and impact speeds.

Despite numerous court cases charging Ford with partial liability for fires caused in accidents, the company has never been found liable in a Crown Victoria accident.

Only the Ford Crown Victoria and the new Ford police car have been certified for high-speed, rear-impact collisions, adding credibility to Ford's statement that fiery crashes are a result of extreme and unfortunate situations.

Intake manifold defect
Model years from 1996 through 2001 using an all-composite intake manifold, are subject to coolant leaks. Late in 2005, Ford settled a class-action lawsuit. See Intake manifold defect for details. This problem can be remedied by upgrading the intake manifold to the 2002 and newer version.

Sales

References

External links

 Ford Crown Victoria (U.S.): Commercial | Police Interceptor | Commercial Version (includes long-wheelbase version)
 

Crown Victoria
Flagship vehicles
Full-size vehicles
Rear-wheel-drive vehicles
Sedans
2000s cars
2010s cars
Flexible-fuel vehicles
Cars introduced in 1954
Cars introduced in 1991
Goods manufactured in Canada
Taxi vehicles
Ford Panther platform